Emilia Mosquito, born January 25, 1982, in Stockholm is a Swedish film director whose short films have made headlines due to their often political and or ideological content. Cage Sickness was awarded for best documentary short at the New York Short 2008 – Expeditions in Film.

During 2009 she was working with artists in Stockholm and New York City in connection with a documentary project, The Main Stream , which was finished in late 2010 and was awarded for best up comer at the Detroit Views 2011 Film Festival. Emilia Mosquito is currently finishing up a degree in law at the University of Stockholm.

Selective filmography 
 2007: Cage Sickness
 2008: Take Me Home
 2009: Edgar Allan Poe's Never Bet the Devil Your Head
 2010: The Main Stream

Sources 
 Internet Movie Database
  Sveriges Regissörer
 Svensk Filmdatabas

External links

1982 births
Living people
Artists from Stockholm
Swedish women film directors